The Mountain Pass League is a high school athletic league that is part of the CIF Southern Section.  It covers the area around the San Jacinto Valley in Riverside County, California.

Members
 Citrus Hill High School 
 Perris High School
 San Jacinto High School
 Tahquitz High School
 West Valley High School
 Liberty High School

References

CIF Southern Section leagues